LG Uplus Corp. (stylized as LG U+) is a South Korean mobile network operator owned by LG Corporation. It was formerly known as LG Telecom, but changed to the current name on July 1, 2010. LG Uplus is the third-largest wireless carrier in South Korea, with 16.652 million subscribers as of Q4 2020.

The carrier adopted its current name after the July 2010 merger with another two LG telecommunication subsidiaries, Dacom and Powercom.
LG U+ offers a variety of mobile services. GeForce Now distributes by U+ 5G in South Korea, and MusicON was discontinued music service for Feature Phones. Kakaonavi recently partnered with LG U+.

History
After a decision of the state-owned Korea Telecom to sell its cellular business to private investors in 1994, the South Korean government opened the telecommunications sector up to competition. Korea Telecom would later relaunch its cellular business with KT Freetel in 1996. LG entered the wireless communications market in 1996 by acquiring a CDMA license in June and founded a new carrier named LG Telecom, which built a nationwide digital cellular network. In October 1997, PCS cellular service was launched.

In March 1998, in an effort to make itself stand out from the bigger, more established players in the market, LG Telecom launched the world's first commercial cdmaOne data service using PCS technology.

To better position itself to compete in the bundled services market, LG Telecom acquired LG Dacom, a fixed-line communications networks and Internet-related service provider and LG Powercom, one of Korea's largest ISPs. On July 1, 2010, LG Telecom switched to its current name, "LG U+."

Services

Wireless
As of 2012 LG Uplus customers can receive the services on any of radio frequency band assigned, one or more of radio interfaces.

In July 2006, the South Korean government canceled LG Telecom's license for 2.1 GHz W-CDMA bandwidth after the company opted not to develop the technology. LG Telecom will instead continue investing and upgrading in its CDMA2000 EV-DO Rev. A network.

In July 2011, LG U+ launched its LTE network, nationwide coverage is expected to be complete by March 2012.

On July 17, 2013, LG Uplus launched LTE-A service with the introduction of the Galaxy S4 LTE-A, the world's first "100% LTE" smartphone that can utilize data, voice and text with LTE and not fall back to CDMA. Starting from 2014 LG Uplus plans to release only "100% LTE" phones.

Landline
In 2010 LG Telecom acquired Dacom Corp., a network services firm that operated Hanaro Telecom's fixed line networks. The new affiliate helped LG enter the landline communications market.

Broadband
Launched in September 2005, U+Home is an optic LAN service that provides fast speeds of up to 100Mbit/s.

IPTV
U+TV was launched in December 2007, providing various two-way services, terrestrial and HD broadcasting.

Business-to-business sales 
After merging LG DACOM in 2010, It was succeeded to LG Uplus one of the largest B2B service area. It is account for about 20% of gross sales by the role of cash-cow. It has not only traditional cable industry, also non-traditional one like electronic payment and so on.

U+ Mobile TV 
LG Uplus' 'U+ Mobile TV' has been broadcasting 10 channels of CJ ENM's affiliates in real time. However, the two companies failed to narrow the gap over the fee for using the U+ mobile TV service. After all, LG Uplus decided to stop this service in June 11, 2021.

See also
 LG Electronics
 SK Telecom
 Korea Communications Commission

References

External links
 
 LG Uplus page on TeleGeography

LG Corporation
Companies listed on the Korea Exchange
Companies based in Seoul
Telecommunications companies established in 1996
South Korean companies established in 1996
Mobile phone companies of South Korea
South Korean brands
Telecommunications companies of South Korea